This might refer to:

 Super Micro Computer, Inc., an American computer hardware manufacturer
 A supercomputer or a mainframe computer built using microcomputer technology